The Barclay Tower is a skyscraper located in the Tribeca neighborhood of Lower Manhattan, New York City. It is tied with One Grand Central Place as the 81st tallest building in New York. The building was erected from 2005 to 2007 and had a topping out ceremony in late 2006. 

The land that the building is standing on was formerly occupied by numerous five-story business buildings, including the Pearl Desk Company structure at 10 Barclay Street.

See also
List of tallest buildings in New York City

References

External links

Apartment buildings in New York City
Residential skyscrapers in Manhattan
Tribeca
Residential buildings completed in 2007